The Tanchangya language is one of the eleven indigenous languages in Chittagong Hill Tracts in present-day Bangladesh, and an ethnic group in the Indian states of Tripura and Mizoram, as well as Rakhine State in Myanmar. It is categorized as an Indo-Aryan language, despite some scholars having the opinion of it being Tibeto-Burman language. It is closely related to Chakma and Chittagonian.

Vocabulary
Tanchangya language is rooted in Indo-Aryan languages, with mixture of Pali, Sanskrit, Prakrit and other middle-Indo-Aryan languages.

Ancient Tanchangya language 
Ancient Tanchangya's words are believed to be the original words of Tanchangya since those words have been handing down a long time ago. It is not simply due to its earlier usage but it is universally understood by every Tanchangya despite any geographical distribution. According to Roti Kanta Tanchangya's collection of some ancient Tanchangya words.

Middle Indo-Aryan
The ancient Indo-Aryan language, Sanskrit is the most influential language impacting on most of the present middle-Indo-Aryan languages such as without Hindi, and with Odiya, Bengali, and Assamese and even in Tanchangya language with distorted and half assimilated form. Though Tanchangya language is thought to be the Indo-Aryan language family, due to its long gap of meeting with Pāḷi and Sanskrit, their vocabularies are almost untraceable distorted forms. According to ‘Tanchangya Parichiti’ written by Biro Kumar Tanchangya of the words originated from Indo-Aryan language.

Tibeto-Burman
Tanchangay language does not belong to Tibeto-Burman language family; however, till today there are many Buddhist religious’ terms are found in the Tanchangya Language. It is believed that after the establishment of first Myanmar Empire, the Bagan Dynasty in 11th century CE, Myanmar language and its culture influence to the neighbouring tribes in many ways.

Foreign words

In Tanchangya language it could also find few vocabularies derived from Arabic, Chinese, Japanese, Portuguese, Dutch, Turkish, Persian, French, English, and Hindi.

Opinions on Tanchangya language
Outside Tanchangya tribe, there is a common belief that there is no difference at all between Tanchangya language and Chakma language. Such an instance can be seen at Dr. Satyakam Phukan's article named “An Analysis of the Ethno-Linguistic Roots and Connections of the Chakma and Tanchangya People”. According to him, the similarity is much compared to the difference between the words between Chakma and Tanchangya.

References

External links

Eastern Indo-Aryan languages
Languages of Bangladesh